The women's 100 metres at the 2014 IPC Athletics European Championships was held at the Swansea University Stadium from 18–23 August.

Medalists

Results

T11
Semifinals

Final

T12
Semifinals

Final

T13
Final

T34
Final

T35
Final

T36
Final

T37
Semifinals

Final

T38
Final

T42
Final

T44
Final

T47
Final

T53
Final

T54
Final

See also
List of IPC world records in athletics

References

100 metres
2014 in women's athletics
100 metres at the World Para Athletics European Championships